La Chiffonnière ("Rag Woman") is a stainless steel sculpture by French artist Jean Dubuffet, installed in Justin Herman Plaza, in San Francisco's Financial District, in the U.S. state of California. It was displayed in Manhattan's Doris C. Freedman Plaza from March 20 to December 12, 1979.

See also

 1978 in art

References

1978 sculptures
Outdoor sculptures in San Francisco
Stainless steel sculptures in the United States
Steel sculptures in California
Works by French people